The Tampa Reservation is one of six Seminole Indian reservations governed by the federally recognized Seminole Tribe of Florida. It is located in Hillsborough County, Florida.

Economic development
The Seminole Hard Rock Hotel and Casino Tampa is located on the reservation in Tampa, Florida, as well as the Hard Rock Cafe, Green Room, and a food court.

History
Tampa Reservation was founded in 1980 on nine acres of land. Ruby Tiger Osceola and 17 members of her family moved from Bradenton onto the reservation, at the urging of then-Chief James E. Billie.

Reservations
Other Seminole Tribe of Florida reservations are:
Big Cypress Reservation, the largest territory, including 81.972 sq mi (212.306 km2), in Broward and Hendry Counties
Brighton Reservation, 57.090 sq mi (147.862 km2), Glades County
Hollywood Reservation (formerly called the Dania Reservation),  acres, Broward County
Immokalee Reservation, Collier County
Fort Pierce Reservation, a  site in St. Lucie County, taken into trust for the tribe in 1995 by the United States Department of the Interior

Language
Most members of the tribe are bilingual, speaking the Mikasuki language (which is also spoken by the Miccosukee Tribe) and English. Use of both Muskogean languages has declined among younger people.

See also
Seminole music

Notes

References
 Pritzker, Barry M. A Native American Encyclopedia: History, Culture, and Peoples. Oxford: Oxford University Press, 2000. .

External links
 Seminole Tribe of Florida, official website

Seminole Tribe of Florida
American Indian reservations in Florida
Populated places in Hillsborough County, Florida
1980 establishments in Florida
Populated places established in 1980